And I Feel Fine... The Best of the I.R.S. Years 1982–1987 is a compilation album by American band R.E.M. It features songs from the band's years at I.R.S. Records. All tracks have been remastered, and the set was released 12 September 2006. A companion DVD, titled When the Light Is Mine, was released the same day.

And I Feel Fine is available in three versions: a standard one-disc version with 21 fan-favorite tracks spanning the Chronic Town (1982) to Document (1987), including every song released as a single on I.R.S. except for "Wendell Gee" and "Superman"; a second edition that adds a bonus disc, including rarities such as the single "Superman", unreleased songs, and alternate mixes; and a third edition, which combines the two-disc version with the When the Light Is Mine DVD.

"Bad Day" and "All the Right Friends" appear in outtake versions, and the final versions of these songs appear on the 2003 Warner Bros. R.E.M. compilation In Time: The Best of R.E.M. 1988–2003. The songs "Theme from Two Steps Onward" and "Mystery to Me" were previously unreleased in any form and, like the version of "Bad Day," were Lifes Rich Pageant outtakes. The band originally intended to include "Theme from Two Steps Onward" as an exclusive track on Eponymous but had lost the tape. Demo versions of all four songs recorded during the Lifes Rich Pageant sessions were released on the 25th anniversary edition of this album.

And I Feel Fine... The Best of the I.R.S. Years 1982–1987 reached #70 in the UK Albums Chart. In the U.S., each version charted separately, with the two-disc version reaching a higher peak than the single-disc version.

Track listing
All songs written by Bill Berry, Peter Buck, Mike Mills and Michael Stipe except "Superman" by Gary Zekley and Mitchell Bottler.

Disc one

Disc two

Best Buy exclusive
An exclusive Best Buy version contained a digital download card which allowed the buyer to download two bonus tracks and a bonus video:

Charts

References

External links
Homepage of Terry Allen, cover artist

Albums produced by Joe Boyd
Albums produced by Don Gehman
Albums produced by Scott Litt
Albums produced by Don Dixon (musician)
Albums produced by Mitch Easter
Albums produced by Bill Berry
Albums produced by Mike Mills
Albums produced by Michael Stipe
Albums produced by Peter Buck
R.E.M. compilation albums
B-side compilation albums
2006 greatest hits albums
I.R.S. Records compilation albums
EMI Records compilation albums